Mali Breg is a settlement in the Municipality of Slovenske Konjice in eastern Slovenia. It lies on the Dravinja River north of Loče. The municipality is part of the traditional region of Styria and is now included in the Savinja Statistical Region.

Name
The name of the settlement was changed from Breg to Mali Breg in 1953.

References

External links
Mali Breg at Geopedia

Populated places in the Municipality of Slovenske Konjice